Pam Shriver was the two-time defending champion and won in the final against Manuela Maleeva, 6–2, 7–6.

Seeds
The top eight seeds receive a bye into the second round.

  Pam Shriver (Champion)
  Manuela Maleeva (final)
  Wendy Turnbull (third round)
  Kathy Jordan (semifinals)
  Jo Durie (second round)
  Anne White (second round)
  Robin White (second round)
  Kate Gompert (second round)
  Elise Burgin (first round)
  Alycia Moulton (quarterfinals)
  Rosalyn Fairbank (second round)
  Susan Mascarin (first round)
  Debbie Spence (first round)
  Sylvia Hanika (second round)

Qualifying

Draw

Finals

Top half

Section 1

Section 2

Bottom half

Section 3

Section 4

References
 1986 Edgbaston Cup Draws
 ITF Tournament Page
 ITF singles results page

Edgbaston Cup - Singles
Singles